Josquin Dor was a Franco-Flemish singer and composer of Renaissance music.

Life and career
Josquin dor was active around 1516 to 1522 serving Cardinal Ippolito d'Este. He later moved to Rome to be in Pope Leo X's musici segreti, and then the papal choir.

Music
The Missa de nostra domina is Dor's only surviving work, though the work's Credo was written by the little known composer Johannes Beausseron.

References

Citations

Sources

External links
 

16th-century Franco-Flemish composers
French male classical composers